Inodrillia martha is a species of sea snail, a marine gastropod mollusk in the family Horaiclavidae.

It was previously included within the family Turridae.

Description
The length of the shell attains 17 mm.

Distribution
This marine species occurs off Martha's Vineyard, off New England, USA, at depths between 187 and 344 m

References

 Bartsch P., A Review of Some West Atlantic Turritid Mollusks. Memorias de la Sociedad Cubana de Historia Natural, 17 (2):81-122, plates 7-15

External links
  Tucker, J.K. 2004 Catalog of recent and fossil turrids (Mollusca: Gastropoda). Zootaxa 682:1–1295.

martha